The Sunline Stakes, registered as the Diamond Jubilee Stakes, is a Moonee Valley Racing Club Group 2 Thoroughbred horse race for fillies and mares three years old and older, under Weight for Age conditions, over a distance of 1600 metres at Moonee Valley Racecourse, Melbourne, Australia. Total prize money for the race is A$300,000.

History

Name

The race is named in honour of the champion mare Sunline. The mare won nine times at this distance including the Hong Kong Mile.

1981–1999 - Diamond Jubilee Stakes
 2000 - Anthea Crawford Stakes
2001 onwards - Sunline Stakes

Distance

1981–1994 -  1600 metres
 1995 - 1623 metres (held at Flemington Racecourse)
1996–2004 –  1600 metres
 2005 – 1500 metres
2006 onwards - 1600 metres

Grade

1981–1990 - Listed Race
1991–1995 - Group 3
1996 onwards - Group 2

Winners

 2022 - Shout The Bar 
 2021 - Quantum Mechanic 
 2020 - Mamzelle Tess 
 2019 - Consensus 
 2018 -  Spanish Reef
 2017 - I Am A Star
 2016 - Miss Rose De Lago
 2015 - Noble Protector
 2014 - Tex'n Hurley
 2013 - Spirit Song
 2012 - Spirit Song
 2011 - Nakaaya
 2010 - Zarita
 2009 - Subtle Cove
 2008 - Laura's Charm
 2007 - Like It Is
 2006 - Candy Vale
 2005 - Beautiful Gem
 2004 - Sylvaner
 2003 - Tickle My
 2002 - Spurn
 2001 - Flushed
 2000 - Rose O’ War
 1999 - Vonanne
 1998 - Burning Embers
 1997 - Prefer An Angel
 1996 - Suma Peace
 1995 - Snap
 1994 - Not Related
 1993 - Excited Angel
 1992 - Acushla Marie
 1991 - Rockets Galore
 1990 - Marathon Star
 1989 - Boardwalk Angel
 1988 - Bianco Flyer
 1987 - Silver Satellite
 1986 - Deedle
 1985 - Mrs. Fitzherbet
 1984 - Special To Me
 1983 - Kalimna
 1982 - Lady Ice
 1981 - Epillette

See also
 List of Australian Group races
 Group races

References

Horse races in Australia